Cyperus albostriatus is a species of sedge that is native to southern parts of Africa.

See also
List of Cyperus species

References

albostriatus
Plants described in 1832
Flora of South Africa
Flora of Botswana
Flora of Namibia
Flora of Swaziland
Flora of Zimbabwe
Flora of Zambia